Suebsak Phansueb (born 14 December 1977) is a Thai sportsperson and actor. He appeared in the film Kerd ma lui (Born to Fight) as Jo, a sepak takraw (kick volleyball) player who is among several national athletes held hostage in a rural village by a drug lord's militia.

He was tasked to read the Athletes' Oath at the opening ceremony of the 2007 Southeast Asian Games, held in his country.

References

External links
 

1977 births
Living people
Sepak takraw players
Suebsak Phunsueb
Suebsak Phunsueb
Asian Games medalists in sepak takraw
Suebsak Phunsueb
Sepak takraw players at the 1998 Asian Games
Sepak takraw players at the 2002 Asian Games
Sepak takraw players at the 2006 Asian Games
Sepak takraw players at the 2010 Asian Games
Medalists at the 1998 Asian Games
Medalists at the 2002 Asian Games
Medalists at the 2006 Asian Games
Medalists at the 2010 Asian Games
Southeast Asian Games medalists in sepak takraw
Suebsak Phunsueb
Suebsak Phunsueb
Competitors at the 2005 Southeast Asian Games
Competitors at the 2007 Southeast Asian Games
Suebsak Phunsueb
Suebsak Phunsueb